Yasnoye Solntse is a rural locality (a settlement) in Sevsky District, Bryansk Oblast, Russia. The population was 8 as of 2010.

Geography 
Yasnoye Solntse is located 37 km southwest of Sevsk (the district's administrative centre) by road. Kruglaya Polyana is the nearest rural locality.

References 

Rural localities in Sevsky District